Afraflacilla venustula is a jumping spider species in the genus Afraflacilla that lives in South Africa. It is related to Afraflacilla altera.

References

Endemic fauna of South Africa
Salticidae
Spiders described in 2009
Spiders of South Africa
Taxa named by Wanda Wesołowska